This is an incomplete list of Filipino full-length films, both mainstream and independently produced, released in theaters and cinemas in 2022. Some films are in production but do not have definite release dates.

Box office

January–March

April–June

July–September

Color key

October–December

Color key

References

External links
 

Philippines